G.I. Joe: Renegades is an American animated television series based on the G.I. Joe toy franchise. The series aired on The Hub from November 26, 2010, to July 23, 2011.

The series was available for instant streaming through Netflix from April 5, 2012, up until February 2015. DVD and Blu-ray releases by Shout! Factory came out in 2013.

Plot
A small group of US military personnel are forced to become fugitives, after uncovering suspicious activity at a Cobra Industries pharmaceutical facility. Now branded as renegades by the media for terrorist crimes that they did not commit and pursued by the military as well as Cobra mercenaries, they must use their specialized military skills to prove their innocence and to expose the true face of Cobra Industries and its mysterious leader, Adam DeCobray.

(According to the recent "Hub Exclusive" TV broadcast promoting this series and Transformers: Prime, homages to The A-Team are used in the background of this incarnation of the characters. Most notable is that Roadblock is stated to parallel B.A. Baracus in size and mechanical aptitude, and Flint is a Lieutenant, rather than a warrant officer and is specifically the officer assigned to arrest the "Renegades", akin to Colonel Lynch of the A-Team series. Also, Lady Jaye is sympathetic to her longtime friend Duke and provides covert support for him and the Renegades, much like Captain Charissa Sosa in the A-Team film and Amy Allen in the 1980s TV series.)

Opening narration
After two episodes, the series' intro is narrated by David Kaye:

Characters

Episodes

Production
G.I. Joe: Renegades finished its first season original broadcast with the episode "Revelations - Part 2" on July 23, 2011. The series went on hiatus status according to Hub PR department, with no news of renewal for a second season in July 2011. On January 26, 2012, when asked when viewers would see a second season, Henry Gilroy said, "Actually, you're probably not going to."

In January 2023, twelve years after the series went off the air, Henry Gilroy revealed that the show's cancellation was its second season sharing similarities with the live-action film, G.I. Joe: The Rise of Cobra

Home video release
On June 5, 2012, Shout! Factory released "G.I. Joe: Renegades - Season 1, Volume 1" on DVD. "G.I. Joe: Renegades - Season 1, Volume 2" was released on DVD on September 25, 2012; the entire season was released on Blu-ray Disc at that time, as well.

In other media

Comic books
As adaptations of episodes of the TV series, IDW Publishing published four comic books under the name of G.I. Joe: Renegades. The comic books were released out of order. Each comic book is 104 pages long.
 Volume 1 was released on January 10, 2012.
 Volume 2 and 3 were released on July 22, 2012.
 Volume 4 were released on August 9, 2012.

Toys
Action figures of Duke, Ripcord, Scarlett, Snake Eyes and Tunnel Rat were released in 2011, based on the characters from G.I. Joe: Renegades, with the additional action figures of Law & Order and Airtight. Renegades versions of Cobra Commander, Cobra Trooper, Firefly and Storm Shadow were also released as action figures in 2011. All action figures were branded as part of the 30th Anniversary line. Finally, the main G.I. Joe Renegades team was completed in 2017 with the release of Roadblock as part of the San Diego Comic Con-exclusive IDW Revolution box set.

Reception

Ratings

The Transformers: Prime/G.I. Joe Renegades block of special programming on Friday from 3:30 p.m.–7 p.m. generated significant gains audience versus the previous week among households and key demographics: HH (+111%, 97,000), Persons 2+ (+133%, 142,000), Kids 2-11 (+130%, 62,000), Kids 6-11 (+78%, 32,000), Adults 18-49 (+117%, 50,000) and Women 18-49 (+120%, 11,000).

References

External links
 G.I. Joe: Renegades at Hasbro Studios
 
 

2010s American animated television series
2010s American science fiction television series
2010 American television series debuts
2011 American television series endings
American children's animated action television series
American children's animated adventure television series
American children's animated science fiction television series
Anime-influenced Western animated television series
English-language television shows
G.I. Joe television series
IDW Publishing titles
Television series by Hasbro Studios
Discovery Family original programming